Peter Palandjian (born February 12, 1964) is the CEO of Intercontinental Real Estate Corporation, a company his father founded. He's also a former collegiate and professional tennis player.

Biography

Early life and varsity career
Born in Boston, to a family of Armenian descent. Palandjian attended Phillips Academy Andover, then went to Harvard University where he had a noted varsity tennis career, and later to Harvard Business School. He twice captained the Harvard team and played in the NCAA championships, both in singles and doubles, as the team's number one player. Palandjian, who graduated with a Bachelor of Arts degree in English and American literature, defeated Pat McEnroe at the NCAA Championships in 1986.

Later tennis career
Palandjian competed professionally after leaving college and won six ATP tour Challenger titles, all in doubles. He also made main draw appearances in singles and doubles at various Grand Prix tournaments. Notable victories include wins over Jay Lapidus (Stratton Mountain, 1987), Ricardo Acuna and Mark Dickson (Raleigh, 1987) Tony Mmoh (Boston, 1998), Martin Laurendeau (Miami, 1998), Andrew Sznajder (Seattle, 1998). One of his doubles partners, at the 1988 U.S. Pro Tennis Championships in Boston, was future world number one Jim Courier. In 1988 he featured in the men's doubles at three Grand Slam events, the French Open, Wimbledon Championships and US Open. He also played men's doubles at the 1989 French Open and mixed doubles at the 1989 Wimbledon Championships. His brother, Paul, was also a collegiate tennis player. The pair played a Grand Prix tournament together at Boston in 1989. During Palandjian's highest career world ranking in doubles he reached No. 175 on July 10, 1989.

Palandjian retired from tennis in 1989.

Business career
Palandjian worked for two years with Bain & Company, as an Associate. He was then an assistant to the CEO of Staples, during which time he studied for his MBA at Harvard Business School.

Since 1993 he has been CEO of Intercontinental Real Estate Corporation, a company founded in Boston in 1959 by his father Petros A. Palandjian, an Armenian immigrant, originally as a construction firm.

Personal life
Palandjian lives in Cambridge, Massachusetts, and has four children with his former wife Marie-Louise "Minou" Palandjian: Manon Palandjian, Petros Palandjian, Margot Palandjian, and Madelon Palandjian. His daughter Manon oversees marketing and communications for his family's company.

He married actress Eliza Dushku in August 2018. In February 2019, Dushku announced that she was pregnant with their first child. Their son Bourne was born six months later, in August of that year. In August 2021, Dushku gave birth to the couple's second son, Bodan.

Challenger titles

Doubles: (5)

References

External links
 
 

1964 births
American chief executives
American male tennis players
American people of Armenian descent
American real estate businesspeople
Harvard Business School alumni
Harvard Crimson men's tennis players
Living people
Tennis players from Boston